Charles Allan Haertling (October 21, 1928 - April 20, 1984) was an American architect, whose works often combined elements of modernism and organic architecture. He is best known for his distinctive residential projects in and around Boulder and Denver, Colorado.

Biography
Haertling was born in 1928 in Ste. Genevieve, Missouri. After completing high school, he joined the Navy, serving from 1946 to 1948. Following his naval service, Haertling studied at the School of Architecture at Washington University in St. Louis, graduating in 1952 with a bachelor's degree in architecture.

In 1953, Haertling moved to Boulder, Colorado to serve on the architecture faculty of the University of Colorado, a position he would hold until 1955, and again later from 1965-1966. In 1957 he opened his own architectural practice in Boulder, completing his first project, a local residential expansion, the following year. Haertling would eventually design over 40 buildings, primarily residential structures in the Boulder-Denver region, completing his last project in 1983. In 1970, the American Institute of Architects inducted Haertling as a member.

In addition to his architectural career, Haertling was also an active participant in local government and community service. From 1967-1973 he served three terms on Boulder's city council, where he was an advocate for greenbelt preservation, civic improvement projects such as the Pearl Street Mall, and environmental awareness. Between 1970-1971, he acted as Deputy Mayor for the City of Boulder. He also served on several local arts commissions and Lutheran church organizations.

Haertling married Viola Brase, with whom he raised four children. He died of brain cancer in 1984 at age 55. A memorial foundation was created in his name to document and promote the preservation of his work.

Style and influences
Haertling's designs reflect an eclectic mix of different architectural styles and philosophies, incorporating elements of modernism and organic architecture, and drawing inspiration from the Usonian principles of Frank Lloyd Wright and the works of Bruce Goff, among others.

He often experimented with forms found in nature, including leaves (Leaneagh House, 1980), mushrooms and barnacles (Brenton House, 1969), yucca plants (Warburton House, 1963), and other natural shapes. At the same time, he also designed many structures according to more mathematical and geometric themes, as in the examples of the Willard House (1962) and the multifaceted Jourgensen House (1971). For his St. Stephens Church in Northglenn, Colorado (1964), Haertling employed a tent-like thin-shell roof, evocative of similar curved concrete designs by Oscar Niemeyer.

Haertling often made efforts to harmoniously integrate his buildings with their physical environments. For his strongly Usonian-influenced Menkick House (1970), he incorporated a local rock outcropping into the structure of the home, echoing Frank Lloyd Wright's Fallingwater. He would also occasionally explore motifs inherent to a project's geographical and cultural environment. For his unbuilt Tambor Guest House project in Costa Rica (1973), he based his design upon traditional thatch hut architecture. For another unbuilt project, the waterfront Chart House Restaurant in Mamaroneck, New York (1982), Haertling used forms reminiscent of wood pier pilings, boats and sails in his sketches.

List of works

 1958: Wheat House, Boulder, Colorado
 1958:  Noble House, Boulder
 1958: White House, Boulder
 1960: Knudsen House, Boulder
 1961: Krueger House, Boulder
 1961: Willard House, Boulder
 1961: Quaker Meeting House, Boulder
 1961: Our Savior Parish Center, Denver, Colorado
 1963: J.R. Knitting Mill, Boulder
 1963: Warburton House, Gold Hill, Colorado
 1964: St. Stephens Church, Northglenn, Colorado 

 1964: Volsky House, Boulder
 1964: Fredrick House, Lakewood 
 1965: Triframe Modular, Denver, Cleveland, Albuquerque
 1965: Frederick House, Denver
 1965: Albersheim House, Boulder
 1966: Moment House, Boulder
 1966: Fahrenkrog House, Snowmass, Colorado (unbuilt)
 1966: Dammann I House, Boulder
 1967: McConnell House, Boulder
 1967: Conlin House, Boulder
 1968: Caldwell House, Boulder
 1968: Smith House, Snowmass
 1968: Faye-Peterson House, Littleton, Colorado
 1969: Boulder Eye Clinic, Boulder
 1969: Brenton House, Boulder
 1970: Kahn House, Boulder
 1970: Menkick House, Boulder
 1970: Steward House, Boulder
 1970: Evergreen Apartments, Boulder
 1970: Grace Lutheran Church remodeling, Boulder
 1970: Davis House, Boulder
 1970: Razee House, Denver
 1970: Gill House, Boulder
 1971: Jourgensen House, Boulder
 1971: Barrett House, Boulder
 1971: Stead House, Boulder
 1971: Solarcrest Condominiums, Vail, Colorado
 1971: Matheson House, Boulder (destroyed in Marshall Fire, December 30, 2021)
 1971: Wilson House, Boulder
 1971: Seminar Center, Boulder
 1973: Tambor Guest House, Tambor, Costa Rica (unbuilt)
 1974: Rink Office remodeling, Boulder
 1974: Dammann II House, Boulder
 1975: Goodman House, Telluride, Colorado
 1975: Ford House, Boulder
 1975: Gosko House, Snowmass
 1975: Baumgartner House, Brighton, Colorado
 1976: Johnson House, Boulder
 1976: Riverside Building, Boulder
 1978: Roitz House, Boulder
 1980: Leaneagh House, Boulder
 1981: Fleck House, Golden, Colorado
 1982: Chart House Restaurant, Mamaroneck, New York (unbuilt)
 1983: Mountain Shadows Montessori School, Boulder (unbuilt)
 1983: Cunningham Addition, Boulder

The Brenton House (1969), also known informally as the "Mushroom House", is notable for making an appearance in Woody Allen's 1973 futuristic sci-fi film, Sleeper, along with several other modernist buildings in Colorado, including I.M. Pei's NCAR labs and Charles Deaton's Sculptured House.

References

External links
 Charles A. Haertling - Architect A.I.A.
 "The art of Haertling" (Kitsap Sun, Oct. 9, 2004)
 "Home of Distinction: Magical Mushroom" (Boulder County Home and Garden, spring 2006)
 "Outside the box: Architect Charles Haertling left a controversial organic footprint on house design in Boulder" (Rocky Mountain News, Jan. 19, 2008)
 ModMidMod - Photos of several Haertling houses
 BoulderMod - Architect Profiles: Charles Haertling

1928 births
1984 deaths
American residential architects
Architects from Colorado
20th-century American architects
People from Ste. Genevieve, Missouri
Architects from Missouri
Washington University in St. Louis alumni
University of Colorado faculty
Deaths from cancer in Colorado
Neurological disease deaths in Colorado
Deaths from brain cancer in the United States